Verbeekite is a rare mineral consisting of palladium diselenide PdSe2. This transition metal dichalcogenide has an unusual monoclinic structure, with pairs of selenium atoms existing as dimers forming layers between palladium atom sheets. Palladium diselenide has five polymorphs. Verbeekite can be synthesised at 11.5 GPa pressure and 1300 °C.

Monolayer PdSe2 has been predicted as a semiconductor and synthesized as an electronic material.

The mineral was discovered in 2002 from the Musonoi Cu-Co-Mn-U mine (Kolwezi), in the Democratic Republic of the Congo. Verbeekite was named after geologist Théodore Verbeek who studied minerals at that mine between 1955 and 1967.

References

selenide minerals
Palladium compounds
transition metal dichalcogenides